Putauhinu Island is an offshore island of New Zealand to the west of the southern tip of Stewart Island/Rakiura. It lies very close to Big South Cape Island.

Conservation
Translocations of South Island saddlebacks to Putauhinu Island occurred in 1974, 1976, and 1984. Thirty Snares Island snipe were translocated from the Snares Islands in 2005.

References

See also
Conservation in New Zealand
 List of islands of New Zealand

Stewart Island
Island restoration
Islands of Southland, New Zealand